Life with Mikey (also known as Give Me a Break) is a 1993 American comedy-drama film directed by James Lapine and written by Marc Lawrence. The film stars Michael J. Fox, Nathan Lane, Cyndi Lauper and Christina Vidal in her film acting debut.

Plot

Mikey Chapman (Michael J. Fox) is a former child star from a 1970s sitcom. Now a talent agent for child stars, Mikey discovers Angie Vega (Christina Vidal), a girl who pick-pockets for money and lives with her teenage sister and her boyfriend. Together, they try to hit it big and earn her a role on a series of television commercials.

Cast

Reception
The movie received generally negative reviews. Review aggregator RottenTomatoes reports that 25% of the 12 critics gave the film a positive review, with 3 fresh and 9 rotten review, with a rating average of 4.05 out of 10.

Box office
The movie debuted at No. 7.

References

External links

 
 

1993 films
1993 comedy films
American comedy films
Films about actors
Touchstone Pictures films
Films directed by James Lapine
Films with screenplays by Marc Lawrence
Films produced by Scott Rudin
Films scored by Alan Menken
Films set in New York City
Films shot in New York City
American children's comedy films
1990s English-language films
1990s American films